Events in the year 1903 in India.

Incumbents
 Emperor of India – Edward VII
 Viceroy of India – George Curzon, 1st Marquess Curzon of Kedleston

Events
 National income - 8,926 million
 1 January – Edward VII is proclaimed Emperor of India.
 SNDP YOGAM, the religious organization of the Eezhava community in Kerala, South India established by the trio, Sree Narayana Guru, Dr Palpu And Kumaran Asaan.

Law
Works Of Defence Act
Victoria Memorial Act

Births
3 April – Kamaladevi Chattopadhyay, social reformer and freedom fighter (died 1988).
Gopi Krishna, yogi, mystic, teacher, social reformer and writer (died 1984).

Deaths
 29 December - Baba Jaimal Singh, Founder of Radha Soami Satsang Beas (born 1839).

References

 
India
Years of the 20th century in India